Ceratostema oellgaardii is a shrub species of Ceratostema found in Loja, Ecuador at elevations from 2600 to 3300 meters.

References

External links
 
 

Flora of Ecuador
oellgaardii
Plants described in 1992